Maya Jayapal is an Indian historian, author, columnist, teacher, and counselor. She is the mother of Pramila Jayapal, the first Indian-American woman elected to the United States House of Representatives.

Early life and education
Jayapal is from Palakkad, Kerala, India. She moved from Chennai to Bengaluru to attend college in 1955, and graduated from Mount Carmel College, Bangalore. After her marriage to MP Jayapal, she resided in Bengaluru for a decade before moving to Jakarta, Indonesia, for 11 years and then Singapore for 13 years. Her daughter Pramila was born in Chennai and raised in Bengaluru until the family moved from India to Indonesia when she was five years old. Since 1993, Jayapal has lived in Bengaluru.

Career
Jayapal is the author of several books, including Bangalore: Roots and Beyond and Bangalore: The Story of A City. Bangalore: The Story of A City was released in 1997 during the commemoration of the 460th anniversary of the city, and includes her research about the Victoria Hotel and the BRV theatre. The book was one of the first histories of Bengaluru that specifically connected to its present, while Bangalore: Roots and Beyond contains additional research and photographs. While residing in Singapore, Jayapal expanded presentations she gave on the history of Singapore into a book, Old Singapore, based on collections of letters and memoirs.

Jayapal has cited Jane Austen, Amitava Ghosh, and Yaa Gyasi as influences.

Personal life
Her daughter, Pramila Jayapal, is a member of the U.S. House of Representatives and the first Indian-American woman elected to the House. Her elder daughter Susheela Jayapal resides in Portland, Oregon, and is the first Indian-American to serve on the Multnomah County Board of Commissioners.

Jayapal lives in Langford Town.

Works
Old Singapore (1992)
Old Jakarta (1993)
Bangalore: The story of a city (1997)
Bangalore: Roots and Beyond (2014)

References

Living people
20th-century Indian writers
20th-century Indian women writers
Writers from Kerala
Mount Carmel College, Bangalore alumni
1941 births
Indian women historians
21st-century Indian historians
20th-century Indian historians
People from Jakarta
Indian emigrants to Singapore
Indian emigrants to Indonesia
Writers from Bangalore
Historians of India